Van Hool NV is a Belgian family-owned coachbuilder and manufacturer of buses, coaches, trolleybuses, and trailers.

Most of the buses and coaches are built entirely by Van Hool, with engines and axles sourced from Caterpillar, Cummins, DAF and MAN and gearboxes from ZF or Voith. Some production involves building bus and coach bodies on separate bus chassis from manufacturers such as Volvo and Scania.

Worldwide, Van Hool employs 4,500 people and manufactures more than 1,700 buses and coaches (bodyworks and complete vehicles combined) and 5,000 trailers each year. It sells an average of 600 coaches annually in the United States.

History

The company was founded in 1947 by Bernard van Hool in Koningshooikt, near Lier, Belgium. In the early years, the company introduced serial production and exported their products all over Europe. Since the mid-1980s, the company has also been active on the North American market.

On February 15, 1957, Van Hool signed a commercial agreement with Fiat; Van Hool would incorporate Fiat engines and other mechanical components (gearboxes, axles, steering) in its vehicles. It developed from a coachbuilder to a Belgian manufacturer of integral buses and coaches, known as Van Hool-Fiat. Alongside these activities, the company continued as a coachbuilder, enabling further expansion.

In August 1958, a year and a half after the agreement with Fiat was signed, the 100th Van Hool-Fiat was delivered, and by July 1961, the figure had exceeded 500. The co-operation agreement with Fiat was terminated in 1981.

Between 1974 and 1978 Van Hool and Dundalk-based coachbuilders Thomas McArdle entered into a partnership known as Van Hool McArdle to take over the bus building factory of CIÉ at Spa Road, Dublin, Ireland. The factory mainly built buses for CIÉ in Ireland plus some for export to the UK. The factory was then closed leaving the Republic of Ireland without a bus manufacturer for several years.

In 1990, Van Hool purchased the coachbuilding business of LAG Manufacturing and continued producing their EOS models for about ten years.

Product range (Europe)
In Europe, Van Hool has a broad range of coaches, though all designs share similar looks and are based on the same platform, the TX. The same philosophy is used on the transit bus range, the A-series.  In recent years, the company has been focusing on new propulsion technologies, introducing fuel-cell hybrid buses as well as diesel-electric hybrids.

Discontinued products

T8 series touring coach
The T8 platform was introduced in 1979. The body was based on the Alizee bodywork that had been launched the previous year. Over the course of several years, a range of touring coaches were developed based on this platform, each distinguished by a number and a name, following a clear naming convention. For example, in "TD824 Astromega":
 T = Touringcar (touring coach)
 D = Dubbeldek (double deck)
 8 = Part of the T8 series
 24 = theoretical maximum number of seat rows
 Astromega = name of the double deck integrals
In 1991, an updated "T8 New Look" was introduced, called the T9 in its North American version. Production was ended in the late 1990s, following the introduction of the new (European) T9 platform.

Model names used during the T8's production run included:
 Acron = integral single deck coach (high floor)
 Alicron = integral single deck coach (standard height)
 Alizee = single deck coach, name used for shorter length integrals and for all single deck bodies built on other manufacturers' chassis, including some bus bodies
 Alligator = articulated single deck coach
 Altano = high single deck coach with low driving position and passenger seating above driver
 Amarant = integral double deck coach ( high, two-axle, rear engine)
 Aragon = single deck coach body built by Van Hool España
 Astral = double deck coach body on mid-engined Volvo B10M chassis (two- or three-axle, small lower saloon at rear)
 Astrobel = double deck coach body on other manufacturers' chassis ( high, three-axle, rear engine).  A one-off extra-high body was also built on a mid-engined Volvo B10MT chassis for use in Britain.
 Astromega = integral double deck coach ( high, three-axle, rear engine)
 Astron = integral double deck coach (high, two-axle, mid engine, small lower saloon at rear)

A-series transit bus
In the 1980s, European countries started to move away from standard bus designs, leaving the design of transit buses to the manufacturers. Van Hool's response was the development of the A-series transit buses. The first member, the A500, was introduced in 1985. A complete family would follow, again following a clear naming convention. For example, in 'AG500':
 A = Autobus (transit bus)
 G = Geleed (articulated)
 500 = height of the floor, in millimeters
Production of the A-series continued into the early 21st century, when it was replaced by the newA-series.

Current products

T9 series touring coaches
The new T9 series in Europe was launched in 1995. It included a completely new body design and many other changes.  The same philosophy as with the T8 was applied: one platform, many different versions. Also, the naming convention was retained. Over the years, many new variants have been developed.  Different models (all available in at least 2 lengths, see 'products' below) include the Atlino and Atlon, with different floor heights, the Alicron, Acron and Astron, standard touring coaches with different heights and thus different luggage space, the Altano, which has an underfloor cockpit, the Astronef, which features a sloping theatre-style floor, and the double deck Astromega.

Additionally, the T9 body is also available on chassis by Scania, Volvo and VDL, though only in Sweden and the British Isles. These motorcoaches are referred to as Alizee (single deck) and Astrobel (double deck).

(The European T9 series should not be confused with the T9 series in the United States market, which corresponds with the European T8 New Look.)

TX series touring coaches

At Busworld 2011 in Kortrijk, Belgium, Van Hool presented the successor to the T9 series. The new series is called TX.

newA series transit buses
In 2001, Van Hool introduced the newA series transit buses, replacing the A series. It featured a new body design and many other changes. A complete family was developed, with different length and configurations.

ExquiCity BRT solution

In April 2011, Van Hool launched the ExquiCity platform, aimed specifically at the BRT market. The bus has the styling and comfort of a tram, with the flexibility and cost of a bus. The ExquiCity was launched in two lengths, the single-articulated ExquiCity 18 and the double-articulated ExquiCity 24. Both are available as trolley buses, diesel-electric hybrids, fuel-cell hybrids or full-electric buses.

First orders were placed by the Italian city of Parma (ExquiCity 18 trolley) and the French city of Metz (ExquiCity 24 diesel electric hybrid). A mock-up was presented at the UITP Congress in Dubai. A fleet of ExquiCity 18s commenced service in Belfast, Northern Ireland on 3 September 2018 delivering the bus rapid transit service marketed under the name Glider.

EX series touring coaches

At the Internationale Automobil-Ausstellung 2014 in Hanover, Germany, Van Hool presented the new EX series of touring coaches for the European market.  It is produced in the Van Hool factory in Skopje, the capital of the North Macedonia.

Product range (North America)
Due to American federal safety requirements and other unique factors, only highway touring coaches were introduced in the United States initially, starting in 1987. Transit coaches by Van Hool were not introduced until 2002. Currently, Van Hool has four separate product lines: the TX series deluxe touring coaches, the CX series touring coaches, the TD925 and TDX double-decker coach, and the A-series transit buses. Van Hool's exclusive dealer in the United States is ABC Companies.

In 2018, Van Hool Headquarters announced plans to construct a new manufacturing facility in Morristown, Tennessee designed to produce public transit buses. The facility is planned to open in 2020, and employ 600 workers, capable of making approximately 400 buses annually.

Discontinued products

T8 series touring coach
The T815 was first introduced to the United States market in 1987. Later subsequent models are collectively known as the T8 series. The earliest use Cummins L10 diesels. Later versions use Cummins M11 diesels.  It was available in  length versions.

T9 series touring coach
T9 series are almost identical to the T8 series visually, and are largely identical mechanically as well, except for incremental updates.  Later models in the T9 series have larger suspension airbags, as well as front disc brakes instead of drum brakes.  Van Hool's VIN consider T8 and T9 to be the same family.  It was available as  T940 or extended  T945 versions.

Current products

T21 series luxury touring coach
Introduced in 1995 and based on the European T9 platform, the T21 series features an updated design and more engine choices.  Whereas the T8 and T9 series are almost exclusively powered by Cummins diesel engines, the T21 series is available with Cummins M11 plus, Detroit Diesel Series 60, or Caterpillar C13 ACERT engines. Later models of the T21 simplified the windshield into two panes only, replaced headlight assemblies with individual projector lamps, and consolidated the driver console.  It is available as  T2140 or extended  T2145 versions.

C2000 series touring coach 

Introduced as a lower-cost coach for long-distance routes, the C20 series, styled similarly to the T21 series, was introduced in 2000 to the United States market. C20 is available with Cummins ISX12 or Detroit Diesel DD13 engines. Previous generations could also be equipped with Cummins M11 plus, Cummins ISM, Detroit Diesel series 60 and Caterpillar C13 engines. Both Allison B500 automatic and ZF AS Tronic automated gearboxes are available.Greyhound operates a fleet of C2045s along with its MCI buses in Michigan.

CX series touring coach

Introduced in 2013 for the 2014 model year, the CX45 is a redesigned C2045 with a redesigned front end, new rear cap, and new interior features. It was offered with the Cummins ISX12 until 2019, before switching to the Cummins X12. The Detroit Diesel DD13 is also offered.

In 2015, Van Hool introduced a 35-foot coach to the North American market to compete with the MCI J3500. This coach is called the CX35 and is offered with a Cummins L9 (ISL9 before 2017) engine.

Introduced in 2019, the CX45E is an all-electric version of the CX45, with Proterra batteries. A CX35E is in the works, but has not been released as of yet.

A3 transit bus series 

Van Hool and ABC partnered with AC Transit (Alameda and Contra Costa counties, California) to demonstrate the A3 series as a future transit alternative in 2002.  The AG300 is an articulated  bus, while the A330 is a  bus.  The A330 and AG300 low floor transit coaches formally entered service in AC Transit's fleet in June 2003. AC Transit has over 290 Van Hool buses either in its fleet or on order as of August 2016.

Van Hool was building sixteen hydrogen fuel cell buses for the United States . These buses are powered by fuel cells from UTC Power and lithium batteries from EnerDell. Twelve of the buses are being purchased by AC Transit and four by CT Transit of Hartford, Connecticut. This project is unusual in that the buses have been designed from the ground up as fuel cell buses and are designed, built, and integrated by a single manufacturer.

In 2008, AC Transit took delivery of a fleet of new model A300L  buses. These buses are unique in the United States market, as they have their engines mounted between the front and rear axles in an attempt to improve the ride quality.  This bus is a longer version of the previously-introduced  A300K (K stands for kort, "short" in Dutch and L for lang, "long").  A survey of AC Transit riders found that they approved of the design and quality of the new buses.

Utah Transit Authority (based in Salt Lake City) purchased ten A300L  buses in 2008, followed by four more in 2009, for its MAX Bus Rapid Transit system. These buses differ from AC Transit's A300Ls as they have three doors and are equipped for cold weather and high altitude operations.

York Region Transit (north of Toronto, Ontario) uses the A330 and AG300 buses on its Viva routes, though the A330 buses are being transferred to the conventional YRT service as more Nova LFX buses arrive for the Viva services.  The Reseau de transport de Longueuil (south of Montreal, Quebec) also uses the AG300 buses, and was the first to use Van Hool transit buses in North America (AG700) in 1989.

Washington, D.C.'s Circulator uses the A330 buses.  These 29 buses were purchased from AC Transit in 2005.  In addition to the A330 models, the Circulator now uses the new A300K buses, which first went into service in April 2009. The Circulator recently took delivery of fourteen A300K,  buses to build out its route structure.  The A300K was chosen because of its ability to do the work of  buses for nearly all operations with the smaller body and engine of a midi bus.

FirstTransit took delivery of twelve A300Ls and four AG300s in early 2009, for use on the University of Minnesota Campus Connector.

Baltimore, Maryland's Charm City Circulator have recently ordered and since put five A300Ls into service early 2011. The A300L was a supplement order to their already existing, but rehabilitating Designline buses.

TD925 Astromega double-deck touring motorcoach
The TD925 Astromega is a closed-top double-decker motor coach meeting United States specifications.  It is a variant of the TD925 Astromega coach available in Europe.

Products

Transit buses

Europe 
 A308 midibus, full low floor, with side-mounted engine. Also available as diesel-electric hybrid
 A309 midibus, low entry (low floor up to the second door). Also available as diesel-electric hybrid
 A320 standard bus (out of production)
 A300 standard bus, full low floor, with side-mounted engine. Also available as diesel-electric hybrid
 A300 CNG standard bus
 A360 standard bus, low entry. Also available as diesel-electric hybrid
 A330 standard bus, full low floor, engine placed horizontally in the back. Also available as diesel-electric hybrid
 A330 CNG standard bus
 AG300 articulated bus, also available as diesel-electric hybrid
 AGG300 bi-articulated bus
 A330T trolleybus
 AG300T articulated trolleybus
 AG300 CNG articulated bus
 ExquiCity 18 articulated BRT bus (diesel electric hybrid, trolley, fuel cell or electric)
 ExquiCity 24 bi-articulated BRT bus (diesel electric hybrid, trolley, fuel cell or electric
 A308E electric bus

North America 
 newA300K  bus, shortened A300L
 newA300L  full low floor bus, side-mounted midship engine
 newA330  full low floor bus, side-mounted rear engine
 newAG300  articulated full low floor bus, side-mounted midship engine

Touring coaches

Europe 
 T915 Atlon
 T916 Atlon
 TX11 Alicron
 TX15 Alicron
 TX16 Alicron
 TX15 Acron
 TX16 Acron
 TX17 Acron
 TX18 Acron
 TX16 Astron
 TX17 Astron
 TX15 Astronef
 TX16 Astronef
 TX17 Astronef
 TX17 Altano
 TX18 Altano
 TX19 Altano

 TDX20 Altano 
 TDX21 Altano
 TDX25 Astromega
 TDX27 Astromega
 EX15H
 EX16M
 EX17H

North America 
 TX40
 TX45
 CX35
 CX45
 TD925 Astromega USA

Japan 
TDX24 Astromega

Trolleybuses
Van Hool A300T
ExquiCity Trolleybus

Airside transfer buses
 Van Hool AP1130
 Van Hool AP1137
 Van Hool AP1237
 Van Hool AP1325 
 Van Hool AP2375

References

External links

 Van Hool official website
 Van Hool Buses (United States only)

Bus manufacturers of Belgium
Companies based in Antwerp Province
Belgian brands
Vehicle manufacturing companies established in 1947
Trolleybus manufacturers
Electric vehicle manufacturers of Belgium
Belgian companies established in 1947
Lier, Belgium